Krister Aunan (born 25 December 1987) is a Norwegian football defender who currently plays for 3. divisjon side Randaberg IL.

He hails from Stavanger and played youth football for FK Vidar and Madla IL. In 2004, he was in the senior squad of Randaberg IL. Ahead of the 2010 season he signed a three-year contract with first-tier club Strømsgodset IF. He made his first-tier debut in March 2010 against Kongsvinger.

In parts of 2012 he played for Bærum SK on loan. In 2013, he went back to Vidar. He rejoined Randaberg in 2014.

References

1987 births
Living people
Sportspeople from Stavanger
Norwegian footballers
Randaberg IL players
Strømsgodset Toppfotball players
Bærum SK players
Eliteserien players
Norwegian First Division players

Association football defenders